Mocis is a genus of moths in the family Erebidae. The genus was erected by Jacob Hübner in 1823.

Lepidopterist David Wagner et al. state about the behaviour of Mocis larvae: "Unlike most catocaline larvae, Mocis caterpillars do not wriggle violently when accosted, but rather simply drop to the ground--a habit shared by many grass feeders--where their coloration blends in with dead, withered grass blades."

Species
 Mocis alterna (Walker, 1858)
 Mocis ancilla (Warren, 1913)
 Mocis annetta (Butler, 1878) (= M. arabesca)
 Mocis antillesia Hampson, 1913
 Mocis bahamica Hampson, 1913
 Mocis camptogramma Dognin, 1919
 Mocis conveniens (Walker, 1858) (= M. detersa)
 Mocis cubana Hampson, 1913
 Mocis diffluens (Guenée, 1852)
 Mocis diplocyma Hampson, 1913
 Mocis discios Kollar, 1844
 Mocis disseverans (Walker, 1858)
 Mocis dolosa (Butler, 1880) (= M. nigrisigna)
 Mocis dyndima (Stoll, 1782) (= M. dindyma, M. teligera)
 Mocis escondida (Schaus, 1901)
 Mocis frugalis (Fabricius, 1775)
 Mocis guenei (Möschler, 1880)
 Mocis incurvalis Schaus, 1923
 Mocis inferna (Leech, 1900)
 Mocis kagoshimaensis Kishida, 2010
 Mocis latipes (Guenée, 1852) (= M. collata, M. delinquens, M. exscindens, M. indentata, M. subtilis)
 Mocis laxa (Walker, 1858) (= M. pavona)
 Mocis marcida (Guenée, 1852)
 Mocis mayeri (Boisduval, 1833) (= M. associata, M. diffundens, M. inconcisa, M. jugalis, M. pellita, M. subaenescens)
 Mocis mutuaria (Walker, 1858) (= M. insulsa, M. judicans, M. nigrimacula, M. torpida)
 Mocis paraguayica Hampson, 1913
 Mocis persinuosa (Hampson, 1910)
 Mocis phasianoides (Guenee, 1852)
 Mocis propugnata (Leech, 1900)
 Mocis proverai Zilli, 2000
 Mocis ramifera Hampson, 1913
 Mocis repanda (Fabricius, 1794)
 Mocis sobria (Möschler, 1880)
 Mocis texana (Morrison, 1875)
 Mocis trifasciata (Stephens, 1830) (= M. demonstrans, M. discrepans)
 Mocis undata (Fabricius, 1775)
 Mocis undifera Hampson, 1913
 Mocis vitiensis Hampson, 1913
 Mocis xylomiges (Snellen, 1880)

Status unclear
 Mocis punctularis, described as Noctua punctularis Hübner, [1808] from Europe.

Former species
 Mocis bifasciata (Inoue & Sugi, 1961) (Melapia)
 Mocis munda (Walker, 1865)

References

  (1961). "A new species of the genus Pelamia from Okinawa (Lepidoptera: Noctuidae)". Kontyû. 29 (3): 157–158.
  (2010). "Descriptions of new species and new subspecies of Japanese Macrolepidoptera (2), with descriptions of 2 new genera". Tinea. 21 (3): 129–135.
  &  (2010). "Annotated check list of the Noctuoidea (Insecta, Lepidoptera) of North America north of Mexico". ZooKeys. 40: 1–239.

External links

 
 
 

 
Euclidiini
Moth genera